James Joseph Cowcher (22 December 1874 – 13 June 1935) was an Australian rules footballer who played with Carlton in the Victorian Football League (VFL).

Notes

External links 

Jim Coucher's profile at Blueseum
Jim Cowcher's profile at Collingwood Forever

1874 births
1935 deaths
VFL/AFL players born outside Australia
Australian rules footballers from Victoria (Australia)
Carlton Football Club players
New Zealand emigrants to Australia
New Zealand players of Australian rules football